Lady Maid Maid is a Taiwanese idol romance drama television series created and developed by SETTV. It stars Nicholas Teo, Reen Yu, Janel Tsai, Danny Liang and Katherine Wang as the main cast for the drama series. The drama debuted on 27 November 2012, replacing Sweet Sweet Bodyguard's time slot on SETTV's 8PM Drama line up. The drama started filming on 25 October 2012.

Synopsis

When Liu Shu Qi was a child, her father died leaving her family in destitute. Gao Xiao Jie generously helped her family get back to their feet. To repay his kindness, she did everything and anything for him, such as waking him up in the morning, covering for him when he went off womanizing instead of working, or apologizing to people he pissed off. There is a laundry list of things she does for love and in the hope of one day marrying him. But their relationship takes a drastic turn when a little girl showed up identifying herself as Gao Xiao Jie's never-before-known daughter.

Cast

Main cast

Supporting Cast
 Aiko Lan Ai Zi (藍愛子) as Qiu Qiu 球球
 Ba Yu as Wu Guan Ling 吳冠玲
 Lin Bo Hong as Liu Shu Yu 劉舒宇
 Wu Jia Shan (吳佳珊) as Liu Zhang Ru Fang 劉張如芳
 Chang Qing (長青) as Xiang Qiu Tian 向秋田
 Yang Li-yin as Xiang Wu Chun Yu 向吳春雨
 Kao Ying Hsuan as Ou Bao Luo 歐保羅
 Lu Yi Long (陸一龍) as Gao Zhong Yue 高仲岳
 Chocolate Lai as Xiao Zheng 小鄭
 Du Si Mei (杜詩梅) as Zhu Zhu Li 朱珠莉
 Judy Ongg as Xiao Jie's mother
 Luo Bei An as Wei Su Hua 魏甦華
 Ma Li Ou (馬利歐) as Gan Di 甘地
 Xie Qi Wen (謝其文) as Li Li 力力
 Kelly Pai as Ou Bao Luo's girlfriend (ep1)
 Akio Chen as Han's father
 Duncan Chow as Luo Jia Liang 羅家良
Pink Yang as  Hao Qiang 郝薔

Cameo

Soundtrack

Opening theme
Magic Power (MP魔幻力量) - 感覺犯 (Magic Power - gǎn jué fàn)

Ending theme
梁文音 - 心裡的孩子 (Rachel Liang - xīn lǐ de hái zi)

Insert songs
Dawen 王大文 - 回心轉意 (Dawen - hui xin zhuan yi)

Rachel Liang 梁文音 - 黃色夾克 (Rachel Liang - huang se jia ke (Yellow Jacket))

Rachel Liang 梁文音 - 月光地毯 (Rachel Liang - yue guang di tan (Moonlight Carpet))

Magic Power MP魔幻力量 - 等等我 (Magic Power - deng deng wo)

Jia jia 紀家盈(家家) - 淚滴 (Jia jia - lei di (Teardrop))

Jia jia 紀家盈(家家) - 改變 (Jia jia - gai bian (Change)

Broadcast

Reception

References

External links
SETTV Official site
Lady Maid Maid Official Facebook page

Eastern Television original programming
Sanlih E-Television original programming
2012 Taiwanese television series debuts
2013 Taiwanese television series endings
Taiwanese romance television series
Fashion-themed television series